Johann George Luehmann (12 May 1843 – 18 November 1904) was an Australian botanist.

Early life
Luehmann was born in Ostmoorende, Prussia in 1843.

Australia
One of a number of influential German-speaking residents  such as William Blandowski, Ludwig Becker, Hermann Beckler, Amalie Dietrich, Diedrich Henne, Gerard Krefft, Johann Menge, Ludwig Preiss, Carl Ludwig Christian Rümker (a.k.a. Ruemker), Moritz Richard Schomburgk, Richard Wolfgang Semon, George Ulrich, Eugene von Guérard, Robert von Lendenfeld, Ferdinand von Mueller, Georg von Neumayer, and Carl Wilhelmi  who brought their "epistemic traditions" to Australia, and not only became "deeply entangled with the Australian colonial project", but also "intricately involved in imagining, knowing and shaping colonial Australia" (Barrett, et al., 2018, p.2), Luehmann emigrated to Australia in 1863 arriving in Melbourne.

In 1868 he became assistant botanist to Ferdinand von Mueller at the National Herbarium in Melbourne and remained in the position until 1896.

In 1878 Eucalyptus luehmanniana F.Muell. was named in his honour. 

Leuhmann was appointed as the Curator of the National Herbarium, Melbourne following the death of Ferdinand von Mueller in 1896. Luehmann also later succeeded Mueller as the Victorian Government Botanist.

Death
He died in 1904 in Melbourne.

Species
Other species named in his honour include;
Acacia luehmannii
Bassia luehmannii
Casuarina luehmannii
Leptospermum luehmannii
Pultenaea luehmannii
Stipa luehmannii

Notes

References
 Barrett, L., Eckstein, L., Hurley, A.W. & Schwarz A. (2018), "Remembering German-Australian Colonial Entanglement: An Introduction", Postcolonial Studies, Vol.21, No.1, (January 2018), pp.1-5. 

1843 births
1904 deaths
19th-century Australian botanists
German emigrants to Australia